Deutschland 83 is a 2015 German television series starring Jonas Nay as a 24-year-old native of East Germany who, in 1983, is sent to West Germany as an undercover spy for the HVA, the foreign intelligence agency of the Stasi. It is a co-production of AMC Networks' SundanceTV and RTL Television by the production company, UFA Fiction, with international distribution by RTL Group's FremantleMedia International and North American distribution by Kino Lorber. 

The series premiered on 17 June 2015 on the SundanceTV channel in the United States, becoming the first German-language series to air on a US network. The broadcast was in the original German, with English subtitles. It subsequently aired in Germany beginning in November 2015, and in the UK on Channel 4 beginning in January 2016. Despite weak initial ratings in Germany, Deutschland 83 became a sleeper hit.

The series was officially renewed on 14 October 2016; the second series is named Deutschland 86.  Deutschland 86 is set in 1986, three years after the original season; it premiered in Germany on 19 October 2018.

A third season, Deutschland 89, was broadcast from 25 September 2020, 1989 being the year of the fall of the Berlin Wall. In a December 2017 interview, it was confirmed that Amazon Germany has secured the rights to Deutschland 89.

Cast

Main
 Jonas Nay as Martin Rauch, code name Kolibri (Hummingbird), a border patrol guard from East Germany, who goes undercover in West Germany as an oberleutnant and aide-de-camp to Major General Edel, impersonating the murdered Lieutenant Moritz Stamm.
 Maria Schrader as Lenora Rauch, Martin's aunt and one of his handlers for the Stasi. She is a cultural attaché of the East German Permanent Mission (StäV) in Bonn.
 Ulrich Noethen as Generalmajor Wolfgang Edel, Martin's boss in the Bundeswehr. General Edel works with the Americans at NATO on the deployment of Pershing II Weapon System missiles.
 Sylvester Groth as Walter Schweppenstette, Martin's father and Lenora's boss at the East German Mission.
 Sonja Gerhardt as Annett Schneider, Martin's fiancée who lives in Kleinmachnow, East Germany.
 Ludwig Trepte as Oberleutnant Alexander "Alex" Edel, General Edel's son who serves in the military with Martin.
 Alexander Beyer as Tobias Tischbier, a professor at the University of Bonn and Martin's handler who works in the Stasi's foreign arm, the Main Directorate for Reconnaissance (HVA).
 Lisa Tomaschewsky as Yvonne Edel, General Edel's daughter who is a member of the Bhagwan Shree Rajneesh cult.

Recurring
 Carina Wiese as Ingrid Rauch, Martin's mother who lives in Kleinmachnow.
 Vladimir Burlakov as Thomas Posimski, Martin's friend who has an affair with Annett while Martin is away.
 Godehard Giese as Lieutenant Colonel Karl Kramer, a fellow spy who helps Martin.
 Errol T. Harewood as Major General Arnold Jackson, the American general who works with General Edel on the deployment of the Pershing II Weapon System missiles.
 Michaela Caspar as Mrs. Netz, General Edel's secretary.
 Jens Albinus as Henrik Mayer, NATO head analyst.
 Nikola Kastner as Linda Seiler, Mayer's secretary.

Episodes
Creator Anna Winger said that all of the episode names originated from NATO military exercises from 1983.

Production
The show was created by the husband and wife team of American novelist Anna Winger and German TV producer Joerg Winger, who pitched it as a trilogy. It is produced by Joerg Winger, Nico Hofmann, and Henriette Lippold. Anna Winger said that they did extensive research with experts who were from both sides of Germany. Historian Klaas Voss from the Hamburg Institute for Social Research was very important in providing historical information. Jonas Nay, who played Martin, said he received technical assistance from military adviser/NATO expert Steffen Meier.

The show was shot in and around locations in Berlin, Germany. A suburb in east Berlin was used to portray period East Germany. For some scenes the Stasi headquarters was used as a location and the production was able to film at the Stasi Museum, which is the actual site of the original headquarters. The actual headquarters for the HVA was however in Gosen about 28 km (17 miles) south east of the Berlin TV tower, less than 1 km (0.6 miles) SE of the Berlin city limits, and approximately 4.5 miles (7.5 km) south of the city of Erkner. The backup bunker for the headquarters of the HVA was also located there.

Directors Edward Berger and Samira Radsi used the same crew—and often the same locations—to shoot their respective episodes. One director would prepare for shooting while the other was shooting. They worked in parallel like this throughout the filming of the show. Radsi said she knew producer Winger from working together on the popular German TV show, Leipzig Homicide.

SundanceTV created a digital marketing strategy that reflected the use of locations in Germany that were meant to recreate both East and West Germany in the early 1980s. Reflecting both the intertitle of the show, the marketing team created sliders that show locations as they were in contrast to the current day. The opening credits were created by Saskia Marka.

Music
The show makes extensive use of 1980s popular music, including Nena's "99 Luftballons", David Bowie, New Order and Eurythmics among others. Each week's episode has a playlist of music from and/or inspired by the episodes. The score was created by Reinhold Heil, who produced the song "99 Luftballons".

Heil, who often collaborates with Tom Tykwer (Run Lola Run), said that he was on board the project when he saw the first scene of the show, where two teenagers are being interrogated by the border guards (one of whom was Martin, the main character) for attempting to smuggle two books by Shakespeare and Marx across the border. He said that it was very realistic, which comes from his similar experience when he was caught smuggling music (Stravinsky and Bach).
 Episode 1 – "Quantum Jump": DJ Geespin of Power 105.1
 Episode 2 – "Brave Guy": WFMU Station Manager Ken
 Episode 3 – "Atlantic Lion": DJ John Fell Ryan of the NYC band Excepter and the documentary Room 237
 Episode 4 – "Northern Wedding": DJ Jonathan Tooubin of New York Night Train
 Episode 5 – "Cold Fire": DJ Takefive of CÜR Music
 Episode 6 – "Brandy Station": Top 10 Songs of 1983 According to Billboard
 Episode 7 – "Bold Guard": DJ David John Bishop
 Episode 8 – "Able Archer": Composer Reinhold Heil
 Episode 8 – "Able Archer" (finale bonus): Creator Anna Winger

The theme for the respective English-subtitled North American and UK broadcasts of the series featured Peter Schilling's "Major Tom (Coming Home)" – the English-language version of Schilling's big 1983 European hit "Major Tom (völlig losgelöst)". However, the markedly different introductory sequence for the German broadcast of the series used New Order's 1983 hit "Blue Monday".

Critical response
Deutschland 83 was met with critical acclaim and received a 2015 Peabody Award. Rotten Tomatoes gives the show a 100% score with an average rating of 8.2/10, sampled from 22 reviews. The consensus states: "An engrossing drama with a fun '80s soundtrack, Deutschland 83 chronicles an intense spy story that brings viewers uncomfortably close to the Iron Curtain." On Metacritic, it holds a score of 79 out of 100, based on reviews from 11 critics, indicating "generally favorable reviews".

The first two episodes of Deutschland 83 premiered at the Berlinale 2015 to very positive reviews. In its US television premiere, it also received positive reviews, with mention of its humor and successful depiction of a Cold War thriller, with favorable comparisons to the US show, The Americans. Many critics called it the best show of the summer of 2015.

Writing in The New Yorker, Emily Nussbaum called the show a gorgeous, slinky thriller, praising its recreation of 1983 Germany as "nearly as aesthetically aspirational" as Mad Men. She questioned the plot line's credibility as Martin's character repeatedly landed, Zelig-like, "at the center of world-historical events", but didn't deem this to be a "deal-breaker". In a mixed review, The New York Times compared the series to shows on the network The CW, given that it focuses on a young adult struggling with being "the only glimmer of sanity in a world gone mad".

Clemens Poellinger from the Swedish newspaper Svenska Dagbladet awarded the series a 5/6 rating. He praises the "excellence in time-faithful environment and details" but also points out the similarities with the series Weissensee.

Philip Oltermann of The Guardian praised the idea of viewing the Cold War from an East German's perspective, but wrote that the show, instead of taking advantage of its "radical premise", "backtracks into stereotype" by portraying East German officers as "cruel ideologues", and the West German peace movement as "infiltrated not just by Soviet agents, but gay Soviet agents at that".

Margret Lyons of Vulture.com praised the work of title designer Saskia Marka, because a "huge part of Deutschland is about pop culture, and music in particular, so of course the titles include a famous German pop song of the era, Peter Schilling's 'Major Tom.'" Marka's opening credits "combine the song's synth vibes with more ominous historical imagery and a little bit of the show's humor. It's the series in a nutshell."

Awards 
Deutschland 83 has received a number of international and domestic awards including an International Emmy Award, a Peabody Award, Grimme Prize, The Golden Nymph, a Metropolis Award, two C21 Drama Awards, a Golden Camera, the "Special Jury Award" of the Roma Fiction Fest, and Series Mania 2015 for Best World Series.

Broadcast 
The series premiered in the United States on 17 June 2015, on SundanceTV, making it the first German-language series to air on a US network.

The success of Deutschland 83 in the US and UK paved the way for another series also featuring a young Stasi agent dispatched to West Germany under an assumed identity, The Same Sky.

In Germany, Deutschland 83 began to air after the U.S. run on RTL 26 November 2015. There, the series lost viewers over the course of its run; the series finale had 1.72 million viewers, or approximately half of the series premiere's viewers. As a result, German newspaper Bild called the show "the flop of the year".

It premiered in Ireland on 29 November 2015, on RTÉ2. All episodes were added to Australian streaming service Stan in December 2015. On 14 January 2016, the series was made available for streaming in The Netherlands via Videoland.

It premiered on Channel 4 in the United Kingdom on 3 January 2016, with the final two episodes shown back-to-back on 14 February. It has since become the most popular foreign-language drama in the history of British television with an audience of 2.5 million viewers as of January 2016.

The series was aired for Iran, Afghanistan and Tajikistan by BBC Persian in October 2017.

See also
 Able Archer 83
 Cold War (1979–85)
 Korean Air Lines Flight 007
 Main Directorate for Reconnaissance
 1983 French consulate attack in West Berlin
 NATO Double-Track Decision
 Pershing II Weapon System
 Strategic Defense Initiative
 Erich Honecker
 Ronald Reagan

References

External links
 
 

2015 German television series debuts
RTL (German TV channel) original programming
Sundance TV original programming
2015 American television series debuts
German-language television shows
Television series about the Cold War
Espionage television series
1983 in Germany
Television series set in 1983
Television series set in East Germany
Works about West Germany
Works about the Stasi
German drama television series
International Emmy Award for Best Drama Series winners
Grimme-Preis for fiction winners